Events from the year 1706 in Canada.

Incumbents
French Monarch: Louis XIV
English, Scottish and Irish Monarch: Anne

Governors
Governor General of New France: Philippe de Rigaud Vaudreuil
Governor of Acadia: Jacques-François de Monbeton de Brouillan then Daniel d'Auger de Subercase
Colonial Governor of Louisiana: Jean-Baptiste Le Moyne de Bienville
Governor of Plaisance: Daniel d'Auger de Subercase then Philippe Pastour de Costebelle

Events
 In 1706, the census of New France was 16,417.

Births
 February 2, 1706: Claude-Godefroy Coquart, missionary (died 1765)
 August 21, 1706: Pierre Nicolas d'Incarville, French Jesuit and amateur botanist (died 1757)
 James Abercrombie, British Army general and commander-in-chief of forces in North America during the French and Indian War (died 1781)

Deaths
 July 9, 1706:  Pierre Le Moyne d'Iberville: Canadian-born French explorer who established settlements in what is now southern Louisiana (born 1661).
 October 11, 1706: Marguerite Bourdon (religious order name, Mother Saint-Jean-Baptiste): one of the foundresses of the Hôpital Général in Quebec; known for her work with the poor (born October 12, 1642).
 November 25, Jacques Le Ber merchant and seigneur in Montreal, New France.

References

 
06